Events from the year 1782 in art.

Events

 Spring – George Romney first paints Emma Hart.
 The Nightmare (1781) by Henry Fuseli is shown at the Royal Academy of London.

Works
 Antonio Canova - Theseus and the Minotaur (Victoria and Albert Museum)
 John Singleton Copley – Midshipman Augustus Brine
 Anne Seymour Damer – Two Sleeping Dogs (terracotta original)
 Étienne Maurice Falconet – Bronze Horseman (Saint Petersburg)
 Thomas Gainsborough
 George, Prince of Wales
 John Hayes St Leger
 Master Nicholls (The Pink Boy)
 Girl with Pigs
 Thomas Jones – House in Naples and similar oil sketches
 Angelica Kauffman – Allegory of poetry and music
 Joseph Lange – Portrait of his sister-in-law Constanze Mozart
 Louise Élisabeth Vigée Le Brun – Self-portrait in a Straw Hat
 Charles Willson Peale – John Eager Howard in Uniform
 Sir Joshua Reynolds
 Captain George K. H. Coussmaker
 The Infant Academy
 Portrait of Sir Banastre Tarleton 
 George Romney – Two paintings of Emma Hart as Circe
 Gilbert Stuart – The Skater
 Johann Zoffany – Charles Towneley in his Sculpture Gallery

Births
 February 9 – William Havell, English landscape painter, part of the Havell family (died 1857)
 February 17 – Thomas Baxter, English porcelain painter (died 1821)
 March – Moritz Fuerst, American engraver and medallist (died 1840)
 March 24 – Orest Kiprensky, Russian portraitist in the Age of Romanticism (died 1836)
 May 16 – John Sell Cotman – English artist of the Norwich school especially watercolours (died 1842)
 May 25 – Vigilius Eriksen, Danish painter and royal portraitist (born 1722)
 October 13 – Joseph Nigg, Austrian painter, with painting on porcelain a specialty (died 1863)
 December 3 – Henry William Pickersgill, English painter specialising in portraits (died 1875)
 date unknown
 Sir William Allan, Scottish historical painter (died 1850)
 Frédéric Théodore Faber, Belgian landscape and genre painter (died 1844)
 Kazimierz Jelski, Polish architect and sculptor (died 1867)
 Yakov Kolokolnikov-Voronin, Russian portraitist and icon-painter (died 1845)
 Frederick Nash, English painter and draughtsman (died 1856)
 William Sadler, Irish landscape painter (died 1839)
 Johann Baptist Dallinger von Dalling, Austrian painter (died 1868)
 Alexander Varnek, Russian portrait painter (died 1843)
 approximate date – John Edward Carew, Irish sculptor (died 1868)

Deaths
 January 11 – Joseph Johann Kauffmann, Austrian painter of portraits, church decorations, and castle depictions (born 1707)
 March 22 – Joachim Martin Falbe, German portrait painter (born 1709)
 April 16 – Giuseppe Vasi, Italian painter (born 1710)
 May 6 – Johann Caspar Füssli, Swiss portrait painter (born 1706)
 May 15 – Richard Wilson, Welsh landscape painter (born 1714)
 June 10 – Paulus Constantijn la Fargue, Dutch painter, etcher and draftsman (born 1729)
 June 26 – Antonio Visentini, Italian architect, painter and engraver (born 1688)
 July 17 – Peter Cramer, Danish book illustrator, decorative and theatrical painter (born 1726)
 August 19 – Francesco de Mura, Italian painter of portraits and frescoes (born 1696)
 December 13 – Christian Friedrich Boetius, German engraver (born 1706)
 December 23 – Claude Drevet, French portrait engraver (born 1705)
 date unknown
 Sabina Auffenwerth, German potter (born 1706)
 Maria Maddalena Baldacci, Italian painter born in Florence (born 1718)
 Antonio Bassi, painter from Ferrara
 Pietro Antonio Lorenzoni, Tyrolean portrait painter (born 1721)
 Francis Swaine, English marine painter (born 1725)

References

 
Years of the 18th century in art
1780s in art